Oconto High School is a public high school in Oconto, Wisconsin, USA. Enrollment is approximately 394 students.

The present school building was constructed in 1969. The school mascot is the Blue Devil and the school colors are blue and gold. The principal of Oconto High School is Adam DeWitt.

Athletics
Oconto is a member of the Wisconsin Interscholastic Athletic Association. It competes in Division 4 for American football and in Division 3 for volleyball, basketball, track and field, wrestling, baseball and softball. It is a member of the Packerland Conference.

In 1999, the volleyball team advanced to the state semi-finals.

In 2003, the baseball team advanced to the WIAA Division 2 State semi-final game against Milwaukee Lutheran in Fox Cities Stadium. The Blue Devils lost 2-1 to the eventual state champion in the final innings and finished the season 17-8.

In 2009, the Oconto wrestling team won its first Packerland Conference championship since 1980 with a 9-1 record. They took third in the Clintonville regional with a score of 169.

In 2012, the volleyball team advanced to the Division 3 state title game but lost to Oostburg High School.

In 2013, the baseball team won the school's first state title, defeating Westby 4-3.

On April 16, 2014, a fire in the school left the school damaged in the bathroom and main hall. The halls and the bathroom were later cleaned up and remodeled and then resumed classes on May 12, 2014.

Academics
In 2009 the OHS LifeSmarts team won first place at the state, then national levels.

Enrollment 
From 2000–2019, high school enrollment declined 33.6%.

Enrollment at Oconto High School, 2000–2019

References

External links
Official website
 Oconto Unified School District website

Public high schools in Wisconsin
Schools in Oconto County, Wisconsin
School buildings completed in 1969